Do You Believe in Magic? is a 2008 American documentary on Magic Johnson, which received the Best Documentary award at the 4th Africa Movie Academy Awards.

References

External links
 Do You Believe in Magic? on Internet Movie Database

Best Documentary Africa Movie Academy Award winners
American sports documentary films
2008 films
2008 documentary films
Documentary films about sportspeople
Magic Johnson
Documentary films about basketball
2000s American films